Verbivka may refer to:

Villages

 Verbivka — Ivano-Frankivsk Oblast, Kalush Raion

 Verbivka — Ternopil Oblast, Chortkiv Raion

 Gammalsvenskby,  a former village that is now a neighbourhood in the village of Zmiivka in Beryslav Raion of Kherson Oblast

Urban-type settlements
  — Vinnytsia Oblast, Illintsi Raion

See also
Verbiv (disambiguation)